The second USS Housatonic was the Southern Pacific Steamship Company freighter El Rio. The ship was one of four company ships temporarily converted for planting the World War I North Sea Mine Barrage.

El Rio was built for the Morgan Line in 1899 and served as a freighter until the United States Shipping Board took control of the vessel in 1917 for conversion to wartime naval use. After return to commercial service the ship resumed normal freight operations. In 1925 the ship was sold to the Clyde-Mallory Lines and renamed Brazos. In 1945 the vessel was sold to Atlantic, Gulf & West Indies Lines (Agwilines) continuing freight service until sunk in a collision in 1942.

El Rio
El Rio was launched as hull number 24 by Newport News Shipbuilding and Dry Dock Company at Newport News, Virginia on 24 June 1899 and completed 19 October 1899 for the Morgan Line. The  ship was assigned U.S. Official Number 136761, signal KPJW with home port of New York, New York. El Rio was intended for service between New York City and Gulf of Mexico seaports of New Orleans and Galveston, Texas. The Morgan Line was incorporated into the Southern Pacific system.

Big Four minelayers
The United States converted eight civilian steamships as minelayers for the 100,000 mines manufactured for the barrage. British Rear Admiral Lewis Clinton-Baker described the North Sea mine barrage as the "biggest mine planting stunt in the world's history."

The largest of the converted minelayers were four freighters owned by Southern Pacific Steamship Company.  Southern Pacific Transportation Company had evolved from the First transcontinental railroad to become the dominant transportation provider in California.  Owners of the original Central Pacific Railroad were known as the Big Four.  Sailors similarly referred to these former Southern Pacific ships as the Big Four.
 El Siglo became No. 1694 USS 
 El Dia became No. 1695 USS 
 El Cid became No. 1696 USS 
 El Rio became No. 1697 USS

Conversion
The United States Shipping Board took control of the ship from Southern Pacific Steamship Company in 1917. Housatonic was fitted out for United States Navy service at Tietjen & Lang's shipyard at Hoboken, New Jersey.  Work began on 25 November 1917.  Gun platforms were added for two anti-aircraft guns forward and a 5"/51 caliber gun aft.  The minelaying conversion enabled her to carry mines on three decks, and included six Otis elevators individually capable of transferring two mines every 20 seconds from the storage decks to the launching deck.  Stern ports were cut for launching the mines and the rudder quadrant was raised to give adequate clearance. Watertight subdivision was improved by strengthening existing bulkheads and building two new bulkheads to divide the largest compartments so the ship might stay afloat if only one compartment were flooded.  Quarters were enlarged to accommodate messing and berthing arrangements for a crew of about 400.  The main machinery was overhauled and auxiliary machinery was added for the elevators, for heating the berthing spaces, for refrigerated food storage, for additional fresh water distilling capacity, for magazine sprinklers and galley and washroom plumbing, and enlarged electric generators for lighting and radio communications.  Existing coal bunkers on the third deck were replaced with a bunker in the hold forward of the boiler room with chutes to load coal over the mines.  Larger boats and heavier anchors required larger davits and anchor windlass, and the mines required specialized handling machinery.

Bunker capacity was 943 tons. Electric power was by four 15kW 110V direct current General Electric generating sets. Crew is shown as 18 officers, 20 chief petty officers and 400 men.

Wartime service
USS Housatonic was commissioned on 25 January 1918 with Captain John Greenslade, USN, in command .  While operating as part of Mine Squadron 1 out of Inverness, Scotland, from 7 June until the close of the war on 11 November 1918, Housatonic laid a total of 9,339 mines:
 planted 769 mines during the 1st minelaying excursion on 7 June,
 planted 800 mines during the 2nd minelaying excursion on 30 June,
 planted 840 mines during the 3rd minelaying excursion on 14 July,
 planted 830 mines during the 4th minelaying excursion on 29 July,
 planted 320 mines during the 5th minelaying excursion on 8 August,
 planted 810 mines during the 7th minelaying excursion on 26 August,
 planted 820 mines during the 8th minelaying excursion on 7 September,
 planted 830 mines during the 9th minelaying excursion on 20 September,
 planted 860 mines during the 10th minelaying excursion on 27 September,
 planted 840 mines during the 11th minelaying excursion on 4 October,
 planted 820 mines during the 12th minelaying excursion on 13 October, and
 planted 800 mines during the final 13th minelaying excursion on 24 October.
Housatonic then made three trips returning soldiers of the American Expeditionary Forces to the United States.

John Greenslade was awarded the Navy Distinguished Service Medal while aboard Housatonic.

Return to Southern Pacific
Housatonic decommissioned 5 August 1919 and was returned to the Southern Pacific Steamship Company. El Rio was renamed Brazos in 1925 for operation with Clyde-Mallory Lines. Brazos on 21 December 1932 had been involved in a collision determined to have been caused by mutual fault in fog off Galveston with Eglantine, a vessel owned by the United States, resulting in a lawsuit by Clyde-Mallory Lines regarding a two-year limitation period for such suits resulting in an appellate court ruling that the two year limitation should have applied. The U.S. Supreme Court affirmed that decision.

In 1935 the ship began operations with Atlantic, Gulf & West Indies Lines (Agwilines) with a signal letter change to WHCB. Brazos continued operating until lost in a collision 13 January 1942. Archer spotted the freighter and put engines in reverse but too late to avoid a collision. Both ships suffered damage with Brazos sinking and Archer eventually requiring tow and repairs in Charleston. All the freighter's crew was taken aboard Archer, two having suffered injury.

Footnotes

See also
History of the Southern Pacific

References

External links
USS Housatonic (ID # 1697), 1918-1919 (Naval Historical Center page Online Library of Selected Images archived as ShipScribe)

1899 ships
Ships built in Newport News, Virginia
Merchant ships of the United States
Ships of the United States Navy
World War I mine warfare vessels of the United States
Maritime incidents in January 1942